Michael W. Skrepnick is a Canadian palaeoartist best known for his illustrations of prehistoric animals. He has produced illustrations featured in natural history museums, scientific journals, books and magazines. He lives and works in Alberta, Canada. Skrepnick is noted for his acrylic paintings of dinosaurs, such as his rendition of the 2016 discovery of the ceratopsian dinosaur Spiclypeus shipporum.

Skrepnick's dinosaur art is recognized for its masterful use of color and imagination, particularly in environmental composition. Some of his most important contributions include cover illustrations for books like the Encyclopedia of Dinosaurs and The Dinosauria. He was a long and close friend of John J. Lanzendorf, whose famous paleoart collection contained many of Skrepnick's original paintings. He was awarded the Society of Vertebrate Paleontology's Lanzendorf PaleoArt Prize in 2001.

References

External links

Living people
Paleoartists
Year of birth missing (living people)
Artists from Alberta